We Are the Champions is a 2005 Danish independent comedy film directed by Martin Hagbjer.

Synopsis
Torben, an unemployed soccer player, becomes the trainer for a local school soccer team that includes his thirteen-year-old son, David. He now has a chance both to repair his damaged relationship with David and lead the team to victory.

Cast and characters
 Lars Bom as Torben
  as Nina
 Bjarne Henriksen as Lennart
  as chairman
 Kristian Halken as Heino
  as David
 Nicolas Bro as Asger
 Anthony Timur Catallar as Mehmet
 Micky Skeel Hansen as Casper
 Saban Özdogan as Hakan
 Nicklas Svale Andersen as Krølle
 Svend Laurits Læssø Larsen as Niclas
 Jonas Sebastian Nielsen as H.C.
 Emilie Fenst as Cecilie
 Susanne Storm as Malene
 Thomas W. Gabrielsson as Simon

Reception
Af banen won the Best Film award at Stockholm Filmfestival Junior.

References

External links
 

2005 films
Danish association football films
Danish comedy films
2005 comedy films
2000s Danish-language films